IWF may refer to:
 Independent Women's Forum, a conservative non-profit organization
 Independent Wrestling Federation, a professional wrestling promotion based in Nutley, NJ, United States
 Institut für Weltraumforschung (Space Research Institute), an Austrian space institute
 International Wargames Federation, international body uniting national wargaming federations of South Africa
 International Weightlifting Federation, the international governing body for the sport of weightlifting
 Internet Watch Foundation, an online policing organization in the United Kingdom
 Inter-working Function, a conversion interface between wireless and telephone networks
 iShares Russell 1000 Growth Index, an exchange-traded fund with ticker symbol IWF